Matthew James Bessette (born December 28, 1984) is a retired American mixed martial artist currently competing in CES MMA where he is the reigning  Featherweight Champion. A professional competitor since 2007, he has also competed for Bellator and the Ultimate Fighting Championship.

Background
Bessette was born in Hartford, Connecticut. He was diagnosed with leukemia on August 13, 1988 at the age of three and was hospitalized for it. The doctors gave him 50% chance of survival, but became more optimistic after the initial treatments, which reduced significantly the leukemic cells. Bessette also developed asthma at an early age, although that never prevented him from competing in sports such as baseball, basketball, soccer, and football. After graduating from Stafford High School in 2003, Bessette attended the University of Hartford. While still in the university, he was introduced to mixed martial arts at the age of 22 and graduated in 2007 with a Bachelor of Science degree.

In June 2016, Bessette opened Ascension Athletics in Bristol, Connecticut.

Mixed martial arts career

Early career
Bessette started his professional career in 2007. He fought mainly for Connecticut-based promotion Reality Fighting. Bessette faced Anthony Kaponis on October 9, 2010 at Reality Fighting: Eruption for the vacant lightweight title. He defeated Kaponis via split decision in a five-round bout. Bessette was set to make his first title defense against Joe Proctor on October 8, 2011 at Reality Fighting: Gonzaga vs. Porter. He lost his title via unanimous decision after five rounds.

Bellator MMA
In 2012, Bessette signed with Bellator. Bessette made his promotional debut against Saul Almeida on March 30, 2012 at Bellator 63. He won via unanimous decision (30-27, 30-27, 29-28). Bessette faced The Ultimate Fighter 12 competitor Paul Barrow on November 16, 2012 at Bellator 81. He won via unanimous decision (29-28, 30-27, 30-27). Bessette faced Nick Piedmont on September 7, 2013 at Bellator 98. He won via knockout early in the first round.

Bessette faced Diego Nunes in the quarterfinal match of Bellator Season Ten Featherweight Tournament on February 28, 2014 at Bellator 110. He won the back-and-forth fight via split decision. Bessette faced Daniel Weichel in the tournament semifinals at Bellator 114 on March 28, 2014. He lost the fight via unanimous decision.

Bessette faced Scott Cleve on September 5, 2014 at Bellator 123. He lost the fight via unanimous decision. Bessette faced Josh LaBerge at Bellator 134 on February 27, 2015. He won the fight due to a doctor stoppage between the second and third rounds.

After a two fight stint with CES MMA, Bessette returned to Bellator and faced Kevin Roddy at Bellator 144 on October 23, 2015. He won via submission with a heel hook in the first round. Bessette faced Keith Richardson at Bellator 153 on April 22, 2016. He won in the second round due to a doctor stoppage.

CES MMA
Bessette made his promotional debut on June 12, 2015 in the co-main event of CES MMA 29 against Khama Worthy. He won via knockout in the second round. He returned for CES MMA 30 on August 14, 2015 against Lenny Wheeler. He lost via knockout in the first round, making it the first time in his career that he was knocked out. After a return to Bellator, Bessette returned to CES MMA on March 11, 2016 to face Taurean Bogguess at CES MMA 33. He won via submission with a triangle choke in the first round. He was originally scheduled to fight Tito Jones, but Jones backed out three days before the event due to injury.

Bessette returned to CES MMA on June 10, 2016 to face Jairo Soares at CES MMA 36, but Soares was pulled the day before the fight for testing positive for performance enhancing drugs. Soares's replacement was Ran Weathers, whom Bessette defeated via submission in the first round.

Featherweight Champion
At CES MMA 37: Summer Gold, Bessette was set to take on Stephen Cerventes for the vacant CES Featherweight Championship, but he was replaced by Joe Pingitore. Bessette won the featherweight belt with a heel hook submission victory in the second round. Bessette successfully defended his title with a TKO win over Kevin Croom at CES MMA 41. At CES MMA 44, Bessette was scheduled to fight Jeremy Spoon but he was replaced with Rey Trujillo. Bessette again successfully defended his championship with a TKO victory.

Dana White Tuesday Night Contender Series
On June 22, 2017, it was announced that Bessette would headline the July 11 premiere event of the Dana White Tuesday Night Contender Series against Kurt Holobaugh. He lost the fight via knockout in the first round. Five days after the fight, it was announced that Kurt Holobaugh used an illegal method of hydrating with an IV, the fight would be declared a no contest.

Ultimate Fighting Championship 
In his UFC debut, Bessette replaced Arnold Allen against Enrique Barzola at UFC 220 on January 20, 2018.  at UFC 220 on January 20, 2018 . He lost the fight via unanimous decision.

Bessette faced Steven Peterson on July 6, 2018 at The Ultimate Fighter 27 Finale. He lost the fight via split decision.

Post-UFC career
After being released from the UFC, Bessette returned to CES MMA, facing Tim Dooling in his promotional return at CES MMA 55 on March 29, 2019. Bessette won the back-and-forth fight via unanimous decision.

He then faced Charles Cheeks III for the vacant CES Featherweight Championship at CES MMA 60 on January 24, 2020. Bessette won the fight via knockout in the third round, claiming the championship for the second time in his career.

After four years away from Bellator MMA, Bessette returned to face Jeremy Kennedy at Bellator 253 on November 19, 2020. He lost the fight by unanimous decision.

Bessette was initially scheduled to fight for the vacant CES lightweight championship bout on September 17, 2021 at CES 64 against Bruce Boyington. However, Boyington withdrew from the bout and was replaced by Ryan Dela Cruz. He won the bout and the title via reverse triangle in the third round. After the bout, Bessette announced his retirement from MMA.

Championships and accomplishments

Mixed martial arts
CES MMA
CES MMA Featherweight Championship (Two times)
Two successful title defenses (first reign)
CES MMA Lightweight Championship (One time)
Reality Fighting
RF Lightweight Championship (One time)
Global Fight League
GFL Lightweight Championship (One time)

Mixed martial arts record

|-
|Win
|align=center|25–10 (1)
|Ryan Dela Cruz
|Submission (reverse triangle choke)
|CES MMA 64: Bessette vs. Dela Cruz
|
|align=center|3
|align=center|4:48
|Hartford, Connecticut, United States
|
|-
|Loss
|align=center|24–10 (1)
|Jeremy Kennedy
|Decision (unanimous)
|Bellator 253
|
|align=center|3
|align=center|5:00
|Uncasville, Connecticut, United States
|
|-
|Win
|align=center|24–9 (1)
|Charles Cheeks III
|KO (punch)
|CES MMA 60: Bessette vs. Cheeks
|
|align=center|3
|align=center|4:01
|Lincoln, Rhode Island, United States
|
|-
|Win
|align=center|23–9 (1)
|Tim Dooling
|Decision (unanimous)
|CES MMA 55: Wells vs De Jesus 
|
|align=center|3
|align=center|5:00
|Hartford, Connecticut, United States
|
|-
|Loss
|align=center|22–9 (1)
|Steven Peterson
|Decision (split)
|The Ultimate Fighter: Undefeated Finale 
|
|align=center|3
|align=center|5:00
|Las Vegas, Nevada, United States
|
|-
|Loss
|align=center|22–8 (1)
|Enrique Barzola
|Decision (unanimous)
|UFC 220 
|
|align=center|3
|align=center|5:00
|Boston, Massachusetts, United States
|
|-
|NC
|align=center|22–7 (1)
|Kurt Holobaugh
|NC (overturned)
|Dana White's Contender Series 1
|
|align=center|1
|align=center|2:59
|Las Vegas, Nevada, United States
|
|-
|Win
|align=center|22–7
|Rey Trujillo
|TKO (doctor stoppage)
|CES MMA 44: Bessette vs. Trujillo
|
|align=center|2
|align=center|5:00
|Lincoln, Rhode Island, United States
|
|-
|Win
|align=center|21–7
|Kevin Croom
|TKO (punches)
|CES MMA 41: Bessette vs. Croom
|
|align=center|3
|align=center|0:32
|Lincoln, Rhode Island, United States
|
|-
|Win
|align=center|20–7
|Joe Pingitore
|Submission (heel hook)
|CES MMA 37: Summer Gold
|
|align=center|2
|align=center|4:38
|Lincoln, Rhode Island, United States
|
|-
|Win
|align=center|19–7
|Ran Weathers
|Submission (guillotine choke)
|CES MMA 36: Andrews vs. Muro
|
|align=center|1
|align=center|4:50
|Lincoln, Rhode Island, United States
|
|-
|Win
|align=center|18–7
|Keith Richardson
|TKO (doctor stoppage)
|Bellator 153
|
|align=center|2
|align=center|3:14
|Uncasville, Connecticut, United States
|
|-
|Win
|align=center|17–7
|Taurean Bogguess
|Submission (triangle choke)
|CES MMA 33: Soukhamthath vs. Nordby
|
|align=center|1
|align=center|2:41
|Lincoln, Rhode Island, United States
|
|-
|Win
|align=center|16–7
|Kevin Roddy
|Submission (heel hook)
|Bellator 144
|
|align=center|1
|align=center|3:47
|Uncasville, Connecticut, United States
|
|-
|Loss
|align=center|15–7
|Lenny Wheeler
|KO (punches)
|CES MMA 30: Felix vs. Lane
|
|align=center|1
|align=center|0:39
|Lincoln, Rhode Island, United States
|
|-
|Win
|align=center|15–6
|Khama Worthy
|KO (punch)
|CES MMA 29: O'Neil vs. Steele
|
|align=center|2
|align=center|2:42
|Lincoln, Rhode Island, United States
|
|-
|Win 
|align=center|14–6
|Josh LaBerge
|TKO (doctor stoppage)
|Bellator 134
|
|align=center|2
|align=center|5:00
|Uncasville, Connecticut, United States
|
|-
|Loss
|align=center|13–6
|Scott Cleve
|Decision (unanimous)
|Bellator 123
|
|align=center|3
|align=center|5:00
|Uncasville, Connecticut, United States
|
|-
|Loss
|align=center|13–5
|Daniel Weichel
|Decision (unanimous)
|Bellator 114
|
|align=center|3
|align=center|5:00
|West Valley City, Utah, United States
|
|-
|Win
|align=center| 13–4
|Diego Nunes
|Decision (split)
|Bellator 110
|
|align=center| 3
|align=center| 5:00
|Uncasville, Connecticut, United States
|
|-
|Win
|align=center|12–4
|Nick Piedmont
|KO (punches)
|Bellator 98
|
|align=center|1
|align=center|1:41
|Uncasville, Connecticut, United States
|
|-
|Win
|align=center|11–4
|Jeff Anderson
|Decision (unanimous)
|Reality Fighting: New Year's Bash
|
|align=center|3
|align=center|5:00
|Uncasville, Connecticut, United States
|
|-
|Win
|align=center|10–4
|Paul Barrow
|Decision (unanimous)
|Bellator 81
|
|align=center|3
|align=center|5:00
|Kingston, Rhode Island, United States
|
|-
|Win
|align=center|9–4
|Aniss Alhajjajy
|Decision (unanimous)
|Reality Fighting: Naples vs. Lee
|
|align=center|3
|align=center|5:00
|Uncasville, Connecticut, United States
|
|-
|Loss
|align=center|8–4
|Andres Jeudi
|DQ (illegal upkick)
|Reality Fighting: Mohegan Sun
|
|align=center|3
|align=center|4:43
|Uncasville, Connecticut, United States
|
|-
|Win
|align=center|8–3
|Saul Almeida
|Decision (unanimous)
|Bellator 63
|
|align=center|3
|align=center|5:00
|Uncasville, Connecticut, United States
|
|-
|Loss
|align=center|7–3
|Joe Proctor
|Decision (unanimous)
|Reality Fighting: Gonzaga vs. Porter
|
|align=center|5
|align=center|5:00
|Uncasville, Connecticut, United States
|
|-
|Win
|align=center|7–2
|John Benoit
|Submission (guillotine choke)
|GFL 10: Benoit vs. Bessette
|
|align=center|2
|align=center|4:59
|Lowell, Massachusetts, United States
|
|-
|Win
|align=center|6–2
|Anthony Kaponis
|Decision (split)
|Reality Fighting: Eruption
|
|align=center|5
|align=center|5:00
|Plymouth, Massachusetts, United States
|
|-
|Win
|align=center|5–2
|Andrew Amaral
|Submission (guillotine choke)
|Reality Fighting: Ignition
|
|align=center|2
|align=center|3:30
|Plymouth, Massachusetts, United States
|
|-
|Win
|align=center|4–2
|Andrew Carron
|Decision (unanimous)
|Reality Fighting: Ferocity
|
|align=center|3
|align=center|4:00
|Plymouth, Massachusetts, United States
|
|-
|Loss
|align=center|3–2
|Chris Chappell
|Submission (guillotine choke)
|FFP: Untamed 26
|
|align=center|3
|align=center|2:13
|Westport, Massachusetts, United States
|
|-
|Win
|align=center|3–1
|Jeff Camera
|TKO (punches)
|Reality Fighting: Collision
|
|align=center|2
|align=center|2:18
|Plymouth, Massachusetts, United States
|
|-
|Win
|align=center|2–1
|Andres Lebron
|Submission (rear-naked choke)
|Reality Fighting: Nightmare
|
|align=center|2
|align=center|2:45
|Plymouth, Massachusetts, United States
|
|-
|Loss
|align=center|1–1
|Bill Jones
|Decision (split)
|Reality Fighting: Annihilation
|
|align=center|3
|align=center|3:00
|Plymouth, Massachusetts, United States
|
|-
|Win
|align=center|1–0
|Chris Correira
|Submission (guillotine choke)
|Reality Fighting: Invictus
|
|align=center|3
|align=center|N/A
|Concord, New Hampshire, United States
|

See also
 List of current Bellator fighters
 List of male mixed martial artists

References

External links
 
 Matt Bessette "The Mangler". sherdog.com

1984 births
Living people
American male mixed martial artists
American male judoka
American practitioners of Brazilian jiu-jitsu
People awarded a black belt in Brazilian jiu-jitsu
Sportspeople from Hartford, Connecticut
Mixed martial artists from Connecticut
Featherweight mixed martial artists
Mixed martial artists utilizing judo
Mixed martial artists utilizing Brazilian jiu-jitsu
University of Hartford alumni
Ultimate Fighting Championship male fighters